Debagram railway station is a railway station under Sealdah railway division of Eastern Railway zone of India. It serves Debagram and Kaliganj areas and situated in station road at Debagram on the Lalgola to Krishnanagar line in Nadia in the Indian state of West Bengal. Few EMU and Lalgola passengers trains are passing through Debagram railway station.

Electrification
The 128 km long Krishnanagar– stretch including Debagram railway station was electrified in 2004 for EMU services.

References

Sealdah railway division
Railway stations in Nadia district
Kolkata Suburban Railway stations